By-elections to the 1st Russian State Duma were held to fill vacant seats in the State Duma between the 1993 election and the 1995 election.

By-elections were held three times. The last by-elections were held on May 28, 1995. After that, the by-elections were not held, as to the termination of the mandate of the State Duma had less than 9 months.

External links
Состав Государственной Думы первого созыва (1994-1995)
Выборы в Государственную Думу первого созыва (1993)

1994 elections in Russia
1995 elections in Russia
 1
1st State Duma of the Russian Federation